Robert H. Anderegg (born August 24, 1937) is a retired American small forward / shooting guard in the National Basketball Association and the American Basketball League . He played professionally for the New York Knicks and the Hawaii Chiefs.

Early life and career
Anderegg was born in Monroe, Wisconsin and attended Monroe High School. He played college basketball for Michigan State University. The 6'3" (1.90 m) 200 lbs (91 kg) guard-forward was selected by the New York Knicks in the 3rd round (22nd pick overall) of the 1959 NBA Draft.

Anderegg played for the New York Knicks for thirty-three games in the 1959–60 NBA season. He played six games for the Hawaii Chiefs in the 1961–1962 ABL season before retiring in 1962.

Awards
In 2008 Anderegg was inducted into the Wisconsin Basketball Coaches Association (WBCA) Hall of Fame.

References

External links
 Bob Anderedd ABL Statistics

1937 births
Living people
American men's basketball players
Basketball players from Wisconsin
Hawaii Chiefs (basketball) players
Michigan State Spartans men's basketball players
New York Knicks draft picks
New York Knicks players
People from Monroe, Wisconsin
Shooting guards
Small forwards